= Pictures with Woofer =

- Also known as: Patty's Picture House
- Genre: Children's television
- Written by: Cliff Braggins
- Presented by: Donna Miller
- Country of origin: Canada
- Original language: English
- No. of seasons: 1

Production
- Producer: Paddy Sampson
- Running time: 30 minutes

Original release
- Network: CBC Television
- Release: 8 January – 24 June 1960

Pictures with Woofer, originally titled Patty's Picture House, is a Canadian children's short film television series that aired on CBC Television in 1960.

== Premise ==
Patty (Donna Miller) and her dog Woofer (a puppet) introduced short films produced by the CBC and by The Walt Disney Company.

== Scheduling ==
This half-hour series was broadcast on Fridays at 4:30 p.m. (Eastern) from 8 January to 24 June 1960. Patty's Picture House was retitled Pictures With Woofer effective with the 19 February 1960 episode.
